Ajay Pratap Singh (born 28 April 1967) is an Indian politician and one of the senior most leader of Madhya pradesh BJP unit. He was elected to the Rajya Sabha from Madhya Pradesh on 15 March 2018. Earlier He also worked as State General Secretary, Vice president and Secretary of BJP Madhya Pradesh Organisation.
In 2011 he Also Worked as a chairman(Cabinet Minister Rank)of Vindhya Development Authority.

References

Rajya Sabha members from Madhya Pradesh
Bharatiya Janata Party politicians from Madhya Pradesh
Living people
1967 births